Adeline Hazan (born 21 January 1956 in Paris) is a French politician, who was one of the Members of the European Parliament for the east of France from 1999 to 2008, and mayor of Reims from March 2008 to April 2014.

She is a member of the Socialist Party, which is part of the Party of European Socialists, and used to sit on the European Parliament's Committee on Civil Liberties, Justice and Home Affairs.

She is also a substitute for the Committee on Legal Affairs, a member of the delegation for relations with the Mashreq countries, a member of the delegation to the Euro-Mediterranean Parliamentary Assembly, and a substitute for the delegation for relations with the Maghreb countries and the Arab Maghreb Union.

She was elected mayor of Reims in March 2008 thanks to the lack of unity of right parties. She competed against former minister Catherine Vautrin.
She was not re-elected in 2014, since she obtained only 42, 75% of votes of citizens ; consequently, her republican competitor, Arnaud Robinet became mayor of Reims in April 2014.

Has the nickname of "La Bonne" (the Maid) after the phrase of the Socialist General Secretary Candidate Martine Aubry at the 2008 Reims Congress of the Socialist Party: "T'aurais pu faire le ménage Adeline" ( "Adeline you should have cleaned the house", after seeing a spider on her desk during her candidacy speech.)

She is a finalist for the 2010 World Mayor prize.

Career
 Master's degree in private law
 Diploma, Paris Institute of Criminology (1976)
 National College for Judicial Officials (nomination in 1980)
 Judge for the implementation of sentences, Châlons-sur-Marne (1980)
 Children's judge, Nanterre High Court (1983) and Paris High Court (1995)
 Adviser to the Minister for Employment and Solidarity (1997–1999)
 President of the Judiciary Association (1986–1989)
 Socialist Party national secretary responsible for social issues (since 1995)
 Member of the Reims Municipal Council (since 2001)
 Member of the Champagne-Ardenne Regional Council (1998–2001)
 Member of the European Parliament (1999–2008)

External links
 Official website, 
 CityMayors profile
 European Parliament biography
 Declaration of financial interests,  PDF file

1956 births
Living people
French people of Egyptian-Jewish descent
Socialist Party (France) MEPs
MEPs for France 1999–2004
MEPs for East France 2004–2009
20th-century women MEPs for France
21st-century women MEPs for France
Women mayors of places in France
Politicians from Reims